Gyula Kertész (also known as Julius Kertész; 29 February 1888 – 1 May 1982) was a Hungarian international footballer who played as a winger alongside his two brothers, Vilmos and Adolf. Kertész was born in Kálnica in what was then Hungary, and was Jewish.

Playing career
Kertész played club football for MTK Budapest in 1906–07 to 1911–12. He also played international football for Hungary, where he earned one cap against Austria in 1912.

In 1911, to supplement his income, along with fellow MTK player Izidor Kürschner he set up a photographic studio.

Coaching career
Kertész coached several clubs in Germany, such as Union Altona (1921–1924) and Victoria Hamburg (1924–1928), and in other countries including France and Scandinavia during the 1920s. He managed Swiss side FC Basel between 1928 and 1930. In January 1931 he took over at Hamburger SV, where he successfully revamped the team, adding Rudolf Noack and other promising new players until he was appointed by VfB Leipzig in the summer of 1932. After his contract had been dissolved by mutual agreement in May 1933, Kertész left Germany and emigrated to the United States.

In the US, he worked in the record industry. His son, who called himself George Curtiss, was a leading manager at Remington Records.

See also
List of Jewish footballers

References

1888 births
1982 deaths
Hungarian Jews
People from Nové Mesto nad Váhom District
Sportspeople from the Trenčín Region
Hungarian footballers
Jewish footballers
Footballers from Budapest
Association football wingers
Hungary international footballers
SC Victoria Hamburg managers
MTK Budapest FC players
FC Basel managers
Hungarian football managers
Hamburger SV managers
1. FC Lokomotive Leipzig managers
Hungarian expatriate sportspeople in Germany
Hungarian emigrants to the United States